Evan Owen Allen (1805–1852) was a Welsh writer and poet born at Pant-y-llin, near Llanrwst, Caernarfonshire, the son of a farmer.

Writings
Allen contributed to Seren Gomer, which had been the first Welsh-language weekly newspaper, and to other publications. However, by Allen's time Seren Gomer was a monthly, and it would later become a quarterly associated with the Baptists.

None of Allen's poetry is thought to have been published.

Death and burial
He died at Ruthin, Denbighshire on 16 December 1852. He was buried at Llanfwrog Baptist Chapel.

References

Sources
Geirlyfr Bywgraffiadol o Enwogion Cymru (1870), p. 27 (in Welsh)

1805 births
1852 deaths
People from Caernarfonshire
People from Ruthin
19th-century Welsh writers
19th-century Welsh poets